Timothy's Monster is the fourth full-length studio album by Motorpsycho. It was released through EMI in Norway, marking their first album on a major label, and through the independent label Stickman Records in the rest of the world. The album was issued as a double-CD or triple-LP.

A 4-CD version was released by Rune Grammofon and Stickman Records to tie in with Motorpsycho's appearance at the 2010 Øyafestivalen on August 14, 2010, where the band played the album in its entirety (albeit in a different running order).

Track listing
 "Feel"  – 3:26 [Sæther]
 "Trapdoor"  – 4:22 [Sæther]
 "Leave It Like That"  – 3:33 [Sæther]
 "A Shrug & A Fistful"  – 3:14 [Sæther/Lien]
 "Kill Some Day"  – 6:53 [Sæther/Ryan/Sten]
 "On My Pillow"  – 7:21 [Ryan]
 "Beautiful Sister"  – 4:11 [Sæther/Lien]
 "Wearing Yr Smell"  – 3:35 [Sæther]
 "Now It's Time to Skate"  – 4:58 [Sæther]
 "Giftland"  – 10:20 [Sæther/Ryan]
 "Watersound"  – 5:11 [Sæther]
 "The Wheel"  – 16:57 [Sæther/Ryan/Gebhardt/Lien]
 "Sungravy"  – 4:36 [Sæther]
 "Grindstone"  – 7:17 [Sæther/Sten]
 "The Golden Core"  – 12:59 [Sæther/Ryan]

Compact disc: CD1: 1–11; CD2: 12–15
Vinyl: Side A: 1–5, Side B: 6–9, Side C: 10, 11, Side D: 12, 13 and Side E: 14, 15.

Single-CD version
It has also been released as a one-CD edition, aimed at the UK and United States markets, with edited versions of some songs.
"Feel" – 3:31
"Trapdoor" – 4:21
"Leave It Like That" – 2:34
"A Shrug & A Fistful" – 3:14
"Kill Some Day" – 6:51
"The Wheel" – 8:48
"Watersound" – 5:10
"On My Pillow" – 5:43
"Wearing Yr Smell" – 3:36
"Now It's Time to Skate" – 4:55
"Grindstone" – 7:16
"The Golden Core" – 13:00

4 CD re-issue version 2010

Released on Rune Grammofon August 9, 2010

Disc 3 track list:
"Leave It Like That" (Sæther)
"A Shrug & A Fistful" (Sæther/Lien)
"Very 90's, Very Aware" (previously unreleased) (Sæther)
"On The Toad Again" (previously only available on the "Dynamo-Open Air 10th Anniversary" compilation, 1995) (Sæther)
"Now It's Time To Skate" (Sæther)
"Watersound" (Sæther)
"Innersfree" (previously unreleased) (Ryan/Sæther)
"Giftland" (Ryan/Sæther)
"Trapdoor" (Sæther)
"Kill Some Day" (Sæther/Ryan/Sten)
"Sungravy" (Sæther)
"Grindstone" (Sæther/Sten)
"The Golden Core" (Ryan/Sæther)

Disc 4 track list:
"President Block" (Epinastic Movements cover) (Stenøien)
"Jr" (Sæther)
"Birds" (Rühle/Sæther)
"Leave It Like That" (edit) (Sæther)
"On My Pillow" (edit) (Ryan)
"The Wheel" (edit) (Ryan/Sæther/Gebhardt/Lien)
"New Day Rising" (Husker Dü cover) (Hart/Mould/Norton)
"Seethe" (Sæther)
"Shock Me" (Kiss cover) (Frehley)
"Workin' For MCA" (Lynyrd Skynyrd cover) (King/Van Zant)
"Space Cadet Boogie" (Gebhardt/Lien/Ryan/Sæther)
"Walking On The Water" (alternative version) (Sæther)
"Mr. Buttercut Goes To The Fair, Meets The Viscount, And That's Where We Leave Him At The End Of This Episode..." (Ryan)
"Celestine" (Ryan/Sæther)
"Sinking" (Sæther)
"The Entertaining Ape" (Sæther)
"Giftland Jam" (Ryan/Sæther)
"Sonnyboy Gaybar" (original version) (Gebhardt/Lien/Ryan/Sæther)

Personnel
Bent Sæther: vocals, bass, guitars, mellotron, drums, percussion, piano, sitar, synth bass
Hans Magnus Ryan: guitars, vocals, piano, percussion
Håkon Gebhardt: drums, banjo, percussion
Lars Lien: piano, wurlitzer, hammond organ, vocals
Helge Sten (Deathprod): theremin, mellotron, samples, synthesizer
with:
Øyvind Enger: cello on "Sungravy"
Lars Mølna: viola on "Sungravy"
Øyvind Brandtsegg: string arrangement on "Sungravy", vibraphone on "The Golden Core"
Anneli Drecker: back. vocals on "The Golden Core"
Kim Hiorthøy: cover artwork

References

1994 albums
Motorpsycho albums
Harvest Records albums